Sabrina Ricciardi (born 21 November 1968) is an Italian politician for the Five Star Movement, who has been a member of the Senate of the Republic since the 2018 Italian general election.

References

See also 

 List of members of the Italian Senate, 2018–2022

1968 births
Living people
Senators of Legislature XVIII of Italy
Five Star Movement politicians
21st-century Italian women politicians
21st-century Italian politicians
Women members of the Senate of the Republic (Italy)